Avoise is a commune in the Sarthe department in the region of Pays de la Loire in north-western France.

Geography
The Vègre flows southward through the western part of the commune, then flows into the Sarthe River, which forms all of the commune's southern border.

The village lies on the right bank of the Sarthe.

See also
Communes of the Sarthe department

References

Communes of Sarthe